L35 may refer to:
 60S ribosomal protein L35
 Big Bear City Airport, in Big Bear City, California
 General Motors L35 CPI 90° V6 engine
 , a destroyer of the Royal Navy
 Lahti L-35, a Finnish semi-automatic pistol